Emma Sulkowicz (born October 3, 1992) is an American performance artist and anti-rape activist who first received media attention for the performance artwork Mattress Performance (Carry That Weight) (2014–2015). The artwork consisted of Sulkowicz carrying a mattress wherever they went on campus during their final year at Columbia University. Sulkowicz said the piece would end when the student who they alleged had raped them in their dorm room in 2012 was expelled or otherwise left the university. The work was a protest against campus sexual assault and the university's handling of the sexual assault case, in which it had cleared the accused of responsibility.

Early life and education
Sulkowicz is the child of Sandra Leong and Kerry Sulkowicz, both psychiatrists from Manhattan, and is of Chinese, Japanese, and Jewish descent. Sulkowicz attended the Dalton School on the Upper East Side, where they were an A student and competitive fencer, and Columbia University, where they fenced sabre for the Columbia University Lions fencing team, and obtained a degree in visual arts in 2015. Sulkowicz is non-binary and uses both she/her and they/them pronouns.

Rape allegation

In April 2013, Sulkowicz, then in the fourth year of a degree, filed a complaint with Columbia requesting the expulsion of fellow fourth-year student and German national Paul Nungesser, alleging he had raped them in Sulkowicz's dorm room on August 27, 2012. Nungesser was found 'not responsible' by a university inquiry. In May 2014, Sulkowicz filed a report against Nungesser with the New York Police Department (NYPD). After the district attorney's office interviewed Sulkowicz and Nungesser and found insufficient grounds for reasonable suspicion, Sulkowicz declined to pursue criminal charges further, saying that NYPD officers were dismissive and had mistreated them. Sulkowicz subsequently focused their senior thesis on a work of performance art entitled Mattress Performance (Carry That Weight). The performance and the allegations received considerable media attention, with Sulkowicz becoming known as "Mattress Girl". Nungesser denied Sulkowicz's allegations of rape, citing as evidence friendly messages from Sulkowicz in the weeks following the alleged attack.

In April 2015, Nungesser filed a Title IX gender discrimination lawsuit against Columbia, its board of trustees, its president Lee Bollinger, and Sulkowicz's supervising art professor Jon Kessler, alleging that they had facilitated gender-based harassment by allowing the art project to proceed. Federal District Court Judge Gregory H. Woods dismissed the lawsuit but allowed Nungesser to refile an amended suit, the refiled complaint was also dismissed, but Columbia settled the case under undisclosed terms after Nungesser's attorney began the process of appealing the dismissal.

Works

Mattress Performance (Carry That Weight)

Sulkowicz created Mattress Performance (Carry That Weight) in the summer of 2014 as a senior thesis while at Yale University Summer School of Art and Music. This performance artwork was in protest against campus sexual assault and the university's handling of Sulkowicz's allegation that a fellow student at Columbia University anally raped them. The university cleared the student of responsibility, and the district attorney's office declined to pursue criminal charges, citing lack of reasonable suspicion.

Sulkowicz's first effort was a video of themself dismantling a bed, accompanied by the audio of them filing the police report, which they had recorded on a cellphone. The mattress later became the sole focus of the piece. Sulkowicz told New York magazine:

The , dark-blue, extra-long twin mattress used in the performance art piece is of the kind Columbia places in its dorms, similar to the one on which they say they were raped. Sulkowicz spent the summer of 2014 creating the rules of engagement: written on the walls of their studio in the university's Watson Hall, these stated that Sulkowicz must carry the mattress whenever they were on university property; that it must remain on campus even when Sulkowicz was not there; and that Sulkowicz was not allowed to ask for help in carrying it, but could accept if help was offered. In September that year they began carrying it on campus, which they said was a physically painful experience.

During a protest organized by the student group No Red Tape on Oct. 29, 2014, hundreds of Columbia students stacked 28 mattresses on Columbia's president Lee Bollinger's doorstep. The mattresses symbolized the 28 sexual assault complaints in Columbia's Title IX case, reported New York magazine. The Columbia student group Student Worker Solidarity, who booked the space for No Red Tape, would be charged $1500 for the removal of the mattresses on behalf of the university.

Newspaper Bodies (Look, Mom, I'm on the Front Page!)
Sulkowicz's final thesis show, the week before graduation in May 2015, included depictions of a naked man with an obscenity and a couple having sex, printed onto a New York Times article about the student they accused. Sulkowicz said that the images were cartoons, and asked: "what are the functions of cartoons? Do they depict the people themselves (a feat which, if you've done enough reading on art theory, you will realize is impossible), or do they illustrate the stories that have circulated about a person?" This work was later shown under the title Newspaper Bodies (Look, Mom, I'm on the Front Page!) as part of a group exhibition at the Southampton Arts Center, Southampton, New York.

Ceci N'est Pas Un Viol

On June 3, 2015, Sulkowicz, working with artist Ted Lawson, released Ceci N'est Pas Un Viol ("This is not a rape"), an eight-minute video of Sulkowicz having sex with an anonymous actor in a Columbia dorm room. The title of the piece is a reference to the caption in René Magritte's The Treachery of Images: "Ceci n'est pas une pipe". Introductory text by Sulkowicz stresses that the sex was consensual throughout, though toward the end it portrays resistance, violence and force. When the video was first posted, each screen displayed the timestamp of August 27, 2012, the night of the alleged assault, but later the date was blurred. Sulkowicz wrote that the work, which examines the nature of sexual consent, was not a reenactment of the alleged rape and later stated that it was a separate piece from Mattress Performance.

Self-Portrait
From February to March 2016 at Coagula Curatorial in Los Angeles, Sulkowicz exhibited a piece, Self-Portrait. For the first three weeks of the exhibition, Sulkowicz stood on a pedestal in the gallery, and had one-on-one conversations with visitors who would stand on an identical pedestal in front of them. The exhibition featured a life-sized robotic replica of the artist that was called "Emmatron". Emmatron plays prerecorded answers to several questions Sulkowicz has been repeatedly asked, which they will no longer respond to. A few examples of questions Emmatron had answers to included "Tell me about the night you were assaulted", "Is this art piece a part of Mattress Performance (Carry That Weight)?" and "What do your parents think of all this?" If audience members asked these questions to Sulkowicz during their conversation, the artist would send them to Emmatron for the answers.

The Ship Is Sinking 
In 2017, Sulkowicz performed a bondage performance piece titled “The Ship Is Sinking”. In the piece, Sulkowicz (in high heels and bikini with the “Whitney” logo, to convey the look of a woman in a beauty pageant) is tied up, berated and hung from the ceiling on a wooden beam by a man in a suit, “Master Avery”, as the figurehead of a ship. Sulkowicz said “white cis men have the privilege of making art that can be divorced from their lives” while “it’s a privilege that I don’t really have so I’m trying to work in a way that makes the best use of that position as I can.” At closing time, the museum turned off its lights, but spectators stayed and used phone flashlights to continue watching until Sulkowicz was finished. Sulkowicz portrayed being able to express the pain they felt and endured, putting themself physically within the artwork.

Untitled Protest Performance
On January 30, 2018, Sulkowicz was documented protesting at two New York City museums and a subway station. During the protest, Sulkowicz posed for several photographs in front of Chuck Close paintings at The Museum of Modern Art and The Metropolitan Museum of Art, a Close mosaic in a subway station, as well as in front of Picasso's Les Demoiselles d'Avignon. Sulkowicz wore black lingerie, with home-made pasties made of tape, and covered their body with drawn-on asterisks. Sulkowicz stated that the protest was a response to a New York Times article from January 28, in which members of the art world, responding to allegations of sexual harassment against artist Chuck Close, debated over the future of art created by individuals accused of improper behavior. Among the people quoted in the article was Jock Reynolds, the then-director of the Yale University Art Gallery, who stated, "Pablo Picasso was one of the worst offenders of the 20th century in terms of his history with women. Are we going to take his work out of the galleries? At some point you have to ask yourself, is the art going to stand alone as something that needs to be seen?" Sulkowicz was reportedly "appalled" by the comments, asking, "are you only showing work by Harvey Weinstein?" The protest was described as a "performance" in the media, and as "performative action" by the artist.

The Floating World
From March 10 to April 22, 2018, The Invisible Dog gallery in Brooklyn, New York hosted Sulkowicz's first gallery installation as a performance artist, a piece entitled The Floating World. The title The Floating world is a literal translation from the Japanese term Ukiyo-e, an ironic homophonous Buddhist term for "sorrowful world." The piece consists of a series of glass orbs  that symbolize trauma, suspended by ropes, containing floating artifacts of personal significance to Sulkowicz and members of their community. A hybrid style of Shibari, Japanese bondage, and Ukidama, Japanese glass floats tied by fishnets, are used respectively to lift and hold the orbs in the air. The relationship of the ropes and the orbs is the metaphor for the love and support Sulkowicz received from loved ones and the community.

Notes

References

1992 births
American people of Chinese descent
American people of Japanese descent
American performance artists
Columbia University School of the Arts alumni
Columbia Lions fencers
Dalton School alumni
Living people
People from the Upper East Side
Non-binary artists
Non-binary activists
Sexual abuse victim advocates
Transgender Jews
Artists from New York City
American artists of Asian descent
Jewish American artists
21st-century American artists
21st-century American Jews